The 1925 serum run to Nome, also known as the Great Race of Mercy and The Serum Run, was a transport of diphtheria antitoxin by dog sled relay across the U.S. territory of Alaska by 20 mushers and about 150 sled dogs across  in  days, saving the small town of Nome and the surrounding communities from a developing epidemic of diphtheria.

Both the mushers and their dogs were portrayed as heroes in the newly popular medium of radio and received headline coverage in newspapers across the United States. Balto, the lead sled dog on the final stretch into Nome, became the most famous canine celebrity of the era after Rin Tin Tin, and his statue is a popular tourist attraction in both New York City's Central Park and downtown Anchorage, Alaska, but it was Togo's team which covered much of the most dangerous parts of the route and ran the farthest: Togo's team covered  while Balto's team ran . The publicity also helped spur an inoculation campaign in the U.S. which dramatically reduced the threat of the disease.

Location and geography 

Nome, Alaska, lies approximately two degrees south of the Arctic Circle, and while greatly diminished from its peak of 20,000 inhabitants during the gold rush at the turn of the 20th century, it was still the largest town in northern Alaska in 1925, with 455 Alaska Natives and 975 settlers of European descent.

From November to July, the port on the southern shore of the Seward Peninsula of the Bering Sea was icebound and inaccessible by steamship. The only link to the rest of the world during the winter was the Iditarod Trail, which ran  from the port of Seward in the south, across several mountain ranges and the vast Alaska Interior, to the town of Nome. In Alaska and other subarctic regions, the primary source of mail and needed supplies in 1925 was the dog sled; however, within a decade, bush flying would become the dominant method of transportation during the winter months.

Outbreak and call for help 
In the winter of 1924–1925, Curtis Welch was the only doctor in Nome. He and four nurses, working at the small Maynard Columbus Hospital, served the town and the surrounding area. After discovering the hospital's entire batch of diphtheria antitoxin had expired, Welch placed an order for more. However, the replacement shipment did not arrive before the port was closed by ice for the winter, and more could not be shipped in to Nome until spring.

In December 1924, several days after the last ship left the port, Welch treated a few children for what he first diagnosed as sore throats or tonsillitis, initially dismissing diphtheria as a possibility; given its contagious nature, Welch would have expected to see more symptoms in family members or others around town, instead of a few isolated cases. In the next few weeks, after the number of cases grew and four children died—whom Welch had not been able to autopsy—he became increasingly concerned about diphtheria.

By mid-January 1925, Welch officially diagnosed the first case of diphtheria in a three-year-old boy who died only two weeks after first becoming ill. The following day, when a seven-year-old girl presented the same tell-tale symptoms of diphtheria, Welch attempted to administer some of the expired antitoxin to see if it might still have any effect, but the girl died a few hours later. Realizing that an epidemic was imminent, Welch called Nome's mayor, George Maynard, that same evening to arrange an emergency town council meeting. The council immediately implemented a quarantine. The following day, on January 22, 1925, Welch sent radio telegrams to all other major towns in Alaska alerting them of the public health risk. He also requested assistance from the U.S. Public Health Service in Washington, D.C.:

Despite the quarantine, there were over 20 confirmed cases of diphtheria and at least 50 more at risk by the end of January. Without antitoxin, it was expected that in the surrounding region's population of around 10,000 people, the mortality rate could be close to 100 percent. A previous influenza pandemic had hit the area in 1918, causing fatalities in about 50% percent of the native population of Nome and 8% of the native population of Alaska. More than 1,000 people died in northwest Alaska, and approximately 2,000 across the state. The majority were Alaska Natives who did not have any resistance to either disease.

Problem solving 
At the January 24 meeting of the board of health, superintendent Mark Summers of the Hammon Consolidated Gold Fields proposed a dogsled relay using two fast teams. One would start at Nenana, Alaska, the closest railhead on the Alaska Railroad, and the other at Nome, and they would meet roughly halfway in the town of Nulato. The trip from Nulato to Nome normally took 30 days. Curtis Welch estimated that the serum would last only six days under the brutal conditions of the trail. Summers's employee, the Norwegian sled dog trainer and musher Leonhard Seppala, was chosen for the 630-mile (1,014 km) round trip from Nome to Nulato and back. He had previously made the run in a record-breaking four days, won the All-Alaska Sweepstakes three times, and had become famous for his athletic ability and rapport with his Siberian huskies. His lead dog, the 12-year-old Togo, was equally famous for his leadership, intelligence, and ability to sense danger.

Maynard proposed flying the antitoxin by plane. In 1925, planes were a relatively new technology, and Alaska's harsh winter weather made them unreliable. Several test flights had been conducted the previous year between Fairbanks and McGrath, Alaska, to determine how well a reliable aircraft could handle the winter conditions. The longest test flight flew a distance of only , a little under half the necessary distance between Nenana and Nome. Furthermore, the only planes operating in Alaska in 1925 were three vintage biplanes, which had been dismantled for the winter; their open cockpits and water-cooled engines would make these planes unfit for the trip as well. Although it was potentially quicker, the proposal to deliver the antitoxin by flight was rejected by the board of health. Instead, they voted unanimously for the dogsled relay. Seppala was notified that evening and immediately began preparations for the trip.

The U.S. Public Health Service had located 1.1 million units of serum in West Coast hospitals which could be shipped to Seattle, Washington, and then transported to Alaska. The next ship north would not arrive in Seattle until January 31, and it would take another six to seven days to arrive in Seward. On January 26, however, 300,000 forgotten units of the antitoxin were located in a hospital in Anchorage. At Governor Scott Bone's order, it was immediately shipped to Nenana and arrived the next day. While not sufficient to defeat the epidemic, the 300,000 units could slow the spread of the disease until the larger shipment arrived.

Travel by sea was hazardous, and across the Interior, most forms of transportation shut down. Furthermore there were limited hours of daylight to fly due to the polar night.

Relay 
The mail route from Nenana to Nome spanned  in total. The route then passed west  over the Kaltag Portage to Unalakleet on the shore of Norton Sound.

Edward Wetzler, the US Postal Service inspector for Nenana, contacted Tom Parson, an agent of the Northern Commercial Company, contracted to deliver mail between Fairbanks and Unalakleet. Telephones and telegraphs turned the drivers back to their assigned roadhouses. The mail carriers held a revered position in the territory, and were the best dog mushers in Alaska. The majority of relay drivers across the Interior were native Athabaskans, direct descendants of the original dog mushers.

The first musher in the relay was "Wild Bill" Shannon, who was handed the  package at the train station in Nenana on January 27 at 9:00 pm AKST by night. The temperature began to drop, and the team was forced onto the colder ice of the river because the trail had been destroyed by horses.

Despite jogging alongside the sled to keep warm, Shannon developed hypothermia. He reached Minto at 3 am, with parts of his face black from frostbite. After warming the serum by the fire and resting for four hours, Shannon dropped three dogs and left with the remaining 8. The three dogs died shortly after Shannon returned for them, and a fourth may have died as well.

Arrival in Minto 
Half-Athabaskan Edgar Kalland arrived in Minto the night before, and was sent back to Tolovana, traveling  the day before the relay. Shannon and his team arrived in bad condition at 11 am, and handed over the serum. After warming the serum in the roadhouse, Kalland headed into the forest.

No new cases of diphtheria were diagnosed on January 28, but two new cases were diagnosed on January 29. The quarantine had been obeyed, but lack of diagnostic tools and the contagiousness of the strain rendered it ineffective. More units of serum were discovered around Juneau the same day. While no count exists, the estimate based on weight is roughly 125,000 units, enough to treat 4 to 6 patients. The crisis had become headline news in newspapers, including in San Francisco, Cleveland, Washington D.C., and New York, and spread to the radio sets which were just becoming common. The storm system from Alaska hit the contiguous United States, bringing record lows to New York, and freezing the Hudson River.

A fifth death occurred on January 30. Maynard and Alaskan House Delegate Daniel Sutherland renewed their campaign for flying the remaining serum by plane. Different proposals included flying a large aircraft  from Seattle to Nome, carrying a plane to the edge of the pack ice via Navy ship and launching it, and the original plan of flying the serum from Fairbanks. Despite receiving headline coverage across the country and support from Arctic explorer Roald Amundsen, the plans were rejected by experienced pilots, the Navy, and Governor Bone. As publisher and editor of the Fairbanks Daily News-Miner newspaper, William Fentress Thompson harshly criticized government officials for inaction and funded a private fleet of planes.

In response, Governor Bone decided to speed up the relay, authorizing additional drivers for Seppala's leg of the relay, so they could travel without rest. Seppala was still scheduled to cover the most dangerous leg, the shortcut across Norton Sound, but the telephone and telegraph systems bypassed the small villages he was passing through, and there was no way to tell him to wait at Shaktoolik. The plan relied on the driver from the north catching Seppala on the trail. Summers arranged for drivers along the last leg, including Seppala's colleague Gunnar Kaasen.

From Manley Hot Springs, the serum passed through largely Athabascan hands before George Nollner delivered it to Charlie Evans at Bishop Mountain on January 30 at 3 am. Evans relied on his lead dogs when he passed through ice fog where the Koyukuk River, flowing into the Yukon, had broken through and surged over the ice, but forgot to protect the groins of his two short-haired mixed breed lead dogs with rabbit skins. Both dogs collapsed with frostbite, with Evans having to take their place himself pulling the sled. He arrived at 10 am; both dogs were dead. Tommy Patsy departed within half an hour.

The transport of the serum then parted ways with the Yukon River as the river turned south and the trail crossed the Kaltag Portage west to the coast. Athabascan Jack Nicolai, aka "Jackscrew", took it up the first half of the portage to Old Woman Cabin and Victor Anagick of the Inupiat village Unalakleet, having driven up to meet him there, took it down the second half, handing it to his fellow villager Myles Gonangnan on the shores of Norton Sound in Unalakleet on January 31 at 5 am. Gonangnan saw the signs of a storm brewing, and decided not to take the shortcut across the dangerous ice of the Sound. He departed at 5:30 am, and as he crossed the hills, "the eddies of drifting, swirling snow passing between the dog's legs and under the bellies made them appear to be fording a fast running river." At 3 pm, he arrived at Shaktoolik. Seppala was not there, but Henry Ivanoff was waiting just in case.

On January 30, the number of cases in Nome had reached 27 and the antitoxin was depleted. According to a reporter living in Nome, "All hope is in the dogs and their heroic drivers ... Nome appears to be a deserted city." With the report of Gonangnan's progress on January 31, Welch believed the serum would arrive there in February.

Connection on Norton Sound 

Leonhard Seppala and his dog sled team, with his lead dog Togo, travelled  from Nome from January 27 to January 31 into the oncoming storm. They took the shortcut across the Norton Sound, and headed toward Shaktoolik.

Henry Ivanoff's team ran into a reindeer and got tangled up just outside Shaktoolik. He was passing the team when Ivanoff shouted, "The serum! The serum! I have it here!"

Seppala turned around with the serum but it was dark by the time he got to Ungalik. Togo led the team in a straight line through the dark, and they arrived at the roadhouse in Isaac's Point on the other side at 8 pm. In one day, they had travelled , averaging . The team rested, and departed at 2 am into the full power of the storm.

While they slept, it had blown out to sea all the ice Seppala had just crossed. There was still some ice close to shore for the next part of their journey along the coast, but it was rough and starting to break up too. They stuck close to shore, and Togo picked his way carefully until they were back on solid ground. Next they had to cross Little McKinley Mountain, another of the toughest parts of the trail because of the many up-and-down ridges. After descending to the next roadhouse in Golovin, Seppala passed the serum to Charlie Olsen on February 1 at 3 pm.

On February 1, the number of cases in Nome rose to 28. The serum en route was sufficient to treat 30 people. Messages were left at Solomon and Point Safety before the lines went dead.

Olsen was blown off the trail, and suffered severe frostbite in his hands while putting blankets on his dogs. He arrived at Bluff on February 1 at 7 pm in poor condition. Gunnar Kaasen waited until 10 pm for the storm to break, but it only got worse and the drifts would soon block the trail, so he departed into a headwind.

Kaasen traveled through the night, through drifts, and river overflow over the  Topkok Mountain. Balto led the team through visibility so poor that Kaasen could not always see the dogs harnessed closest to the sled. He was two miles (3 km) past Solomon before he realized it, and kept going. The winds after Solomon were so severe that his sled flipped over and he almost lost the cylinder containing the serum when it fell off and became buried in the snow. He also suffered frostbite when he had to use his bare hands to feel for the cylinder.

Kaasen reached Point Safety ahead of schedule on February 2, at 3 am. Ed Rohn believed that Kaasen and the relay had halted at Solomon, so he was sleeping. Since the weather was improving, it would take time to prepare Rohn's team, and Balto and the other dogs were moving well, Kaasen pressed on with the remaining  to Nome, reaching Front Street at 5:30 am. Not a single ampule was broken, and the antitoxin was thawed and ready by noon.

A number of dogs died during the trip.

Second relay 
Margaret Curran from the Solomon Roadhouse was infected, which raised fears that the disease might spread from patrons of the roadhouse to other communities. The 1.1 million units had left Seattle on January 31, and were not due by dog sled until February 8. Welch asked for half the serum to be delivered by aircraft from Fairbanks. He contacted Thompson and Sutherland, and Darling made a test flight the next morning. With his health advisor, Governor Bone concluded the cases in Nome were actually going down, and withheld permission, but preparations went ahead. The U.S. Navy moved a minesweeper north from Seattle, and the Signal Corps were ordered to light fires to guide the planes.

By February 3, the original 300,000 units had proved to be still effective, and the epidemic was under control. A sixth death, probably unrelated to diphtheria, was widely reported as a new outbreak of the disease. The batch from Seattle arrived on board the Admiral Watson on February 7. Acceding to pressure, Governor Bone authorized half to be delivered by plane. On February 8, the first half of the second shipment began its trip by dog sled, while the plane failed to start when a broken radiator shutter caused the engine to overheat. The plane failed the next day as well, and the mission was scrapped. Thompson was gracious in his editorials.

The second relay included many of the same drivers, and also faced harsh conditions. Ed Rohn delivered the serum to Nome during another blizzard after a  run on February 15.

Aftermath 

The death toll from diphtheria in Nome is officially listed as either 5, 6, or 7, but Welch later estimated there were probably at least 100 additional cases among "the Eskimo camps outside the city. The Natives have a habit of burying their children without reporting the death." Forty-three new cases were diagnosed in 1926, but they were easily managed with the fresh supply of serum.

All participants in the dogsleds received letters of commendation from President Calvin Coolidge, and the Senate stopped work to recognize the event. Each musher during the first relay received a gold medal from the H. K. Mulford Company. The mayor of Los Angeles presented a bone-shaped key to the city to Balto in front of City Hall and silent-film actress Mary Pickford put a wreath around the canine's neck. Poems and letters from children poured in, and spontaneous fundraising campaigns sprang up around the country.

Gunnar Kaasen and his team became celebrities and toured the West Coast from February 1925 to February 1926, and also starred in a 30-minute film entitled Balto's Race to Nome. A statue of Balto by sculptor Frederick Roth was unveiled in New York City's Central Park during a visit on December 15, 1925. Balto and the other dogs later became part of a sideshow and lived in horrible conditions until they were rescued by George Kimble, who organized a fundraising campaign by the children of Cleveland, Ohio. On March 19, 1927, the dogs received a hero's welcome as they arrived at their permanent home at the Cleveland Zoo. Because of his age, Balto was euthanised on March 14, 1933, at the age of 14. He was mounted and placed on display in the Cleveland Museum of Natural History.

In October 1926, Seppala took Togo and his team on a tour from Seattle to California, and then across the Midwest to New England, and consistently drew huge crowds. They were featured at Madison Square Garden in New York City for 10 days, and Togo received a gold medal from Roald Amundsen. In New England, Seppala's team of Siberians ran in many races, easily defeating the local Chinooks of Arthur Walden. Seppala entered into a partnership with Elizabeth M. Ricker in Poland Spring, Maine, where many of his dogs went to live in retirement and contribute to their breeding program of Siberian sled dogs, including Togo, who sired many litters. Seppala visited Togo, and was by his side when he was euthanized on December 5, 1929, at the age of 16. After his death, Seppala had Togo preserved and mounted, and today the dog is on display in a glass case at the Iditarod museum in Wasilla, Alaska. Togo's prowess as a sled dog also led to his strengths being preserved through breeding, with his descendants contributing to the "Seppala Siberian Sleddog", a sought after working sled dog line, as well as the mainstream show-stock Siberian Husky gene pool.

None of the other mushers received the same degree of attention, though Wild Bill Shannon briefly toured with Blackie. The media largely ignored the Alaska Native mushers, who covered two-thirds of the distance to Nome. According to Edgar Kalland, "it was just an everyday occurrence as far as we were concerned."

Air mail 
The serum race helped spur the Kelly Act, which was signed into law on February 2. The bill allowed private aviation companies to bid on mail delivery contracts. Technology improved and, within a decade, air mail routes were established in Alaska. The last mail delivery by private dog sled under contract took place in 1938, and the last U.S. Post Office dog sled route closed in 1963. Dog sledding remained popular in the rural interior but became nearly extinct when snowmobiles spread in the 1960s. Mushing was revitalized as a recreational sport in the 1970s with the immense popularity of the Iditarod Trail Sled Dog Race.

The honorary musher for the first seven races was Leonhard Seppala. Other serum run participants, including "Wild Bill" Shannon, Edgar Kalland, Bill McCarty, Charlie Evans, Edgar Nollner, Harry Pitka, and Henry Ivanoff have also been honored. The 2005 Iditarod honored Jirdes Winther Baxter, the last known survivor of the epidemic. The position is now known as Leonhard Seppala's Honorary Musher, the Leonhard Seppala Humanitarian Award is given to the musher who provides the best dog care while still remaining competitive, and the Leonhard Seppala Heritage Grant is an Iditarod scholarship. The two races follow the same route from Ruby to Nome.

A reenactment of the serum run was held in 1975, which took 6 days longer than the 1925 serum run, or more than twice the total time. Many of the participants were descendants of the original 20. In 1985, President Ronald Reagan sent a letter of recognition to Charlie Evans, Edgar Nollner, and Bill McCarty, the only remaining survivors. Nollner was the last to die, on January 18, 1999, of a heart attack.

Popular media 
The relay has been depicted in various media. Shortly before World War II, Czech teacher and writer František Omelka was fascinated by the story, writing the novella Štafeta ("Relay") published in Czech in 1946. As an avid Esperantist, Omelka himself translated it into Esperanto, with subsequent translations into German, Dutch, Frisian, Icelandic, Chinese, Japanese, and English. In 1976, the story was retold in Race Against Death: A True Story of the Far North, by children's author Seymour Reit. Reit's book was featured in a 1978 episode of The Book Bird, a PBS program where host John Robbins illustrated key scenes from the book being discussed. The 1995 animated film Balto was loosely based on the events of the final leg of the serum run, although all of the characters besides Balto are fictional. A detailed recounting of the people and events involved in the serum run, including the story of the native mushers and the local nurses who attended to the sick and dying, is included in the 2003 book, The Cruelest Miles: The Heroic Story of Dogs and Men in a Race Against an Epidemic, by Gay and Laney Salisbury. In 2013, a documentary titled Icebound – The Greatest Dog Story Ever Told, focused on the aftermath of the events. The Great Alaskan Race, a 2019 film, produced by Rebel Road Entertainment, is based on the serum run. Togo, produced by Walt Disney Pictures, debuted on December 20, 2019, on Disney+.

Sled dog credit 
There is much controversy surrounding Balto's role in the serum run and the statue in Central Park. He then handed the serum off to Charlie Olson. Olson carried it  to Bluff where he turned it over to Gunnar Kaasen. Kaasen was supposed to hand off the serum to Rohn at Port Safety, but Rohn had gone to sleep and Kaasen decided to keep going to Nome. Kaasen maintained that he decided to continue since there were no lights on in the cabin where Rohn was sleeping and he did not want to waste time, but many, including Rohn based on conversations the two men had before leaving Nome, and other decorated mushers in the surrounding area, thought his decision to not wake Rohn was motivated by a desire to grab the glory for himself and Balto.

According to Togo's musher, Leonhard Seppala, who was also Balto's owner, Balto was a scrub freight dog that he left behind when he set out on the trip. He also asserted that Kaasen's lead dog was actually a dog named Fox, but that news agents of the time thought that Balto was a more newsworthy name. No record exists of Seppala ever having used Balto as a leader in runs or races prior to 1925, and Seppala himself stated Balto "was never in a winning team". Because the pictures and video of Kaasen and Balto taken in Nome were recreated hours after their arrival once the sun had risen, speculation still exists as to whether Balto's position as lead dog was genuine, or was staged or exaggerated for media purposes.

The Central Park statue of Balto was modeled after Balto, but shows him wearing Togo's colors (awards). The inscription reads, "Dedicated to the indomitable spirit of the sled dogs that relayed antitoxin 600 miles over rough ice, across treacherous waters, through arctic blizzards, from Nenana to the relief of stricken Nome." In the last years of his life, Seppala was heartbroken by the way the credit had gone to Balto; in his mind, Togo was the real hero of the serum race. According to the National Park Service, in 1960 Seppala said:

Katy Steinmetz, writing in Time magazine, also thought that Togo was the greatest sled dog of all time. In the serum run, she wrote, Togo was the real hero:

Relay participants and distances 
Mushers (in order) and the distances they covered.

References

Sources

External links 
  – from the official website of the Iditarod race organizers

1925 disease outbreaks
1925 in Alaska
Dog sledding
Iditarod
Nome, Alaska
Diphtheria
Territory of Alaska
Roaring Twenties